James G. Townsend is an American politician, currently serving as a member and Minority Leader of the New Mexico House of Representatives, where he represents the 54th district.

Early life and education 
Townsend was born and raised in Carlsbad, New Mexico. He graduated from New Mexico State University.

Career 
After graduating from college, Townsend worked several jobs in the energy sector, including as director of Holly Energy Partners, a subsidiary of HollyFrontier, from 2012–2017. Townsend was elected to the New Mexico House of Representatives in 2016 and became Minority Leader at the start of the 2019 legislative session. An opponent of abortion, Townsend voted against House Bill 51, which attempted to repeal an old New Mexico law that makes it a crime to perform an abortion.

In 2022, Townsend obstructed the New Mexico legislature from passing voting reform legislation. The legislation would have allowed people to sign up once to receive absentee ballots in future elections; restored the voting rights of felons; and required every county to provide a minimum of two ballot drop boxes.

References

External links
 New Mexico Legislature Biography

21st-century American politicians
Living people
Republican Party members of the New Mexico House of Representatives
Year of birth missing (living people)